Meikei Ieong from the TSMC Europe B.V, Amsterdam, Netherlands was named Fellow of the Institute of Electrical and Electronics Engineers (IEEE) in 2015 for leadership in development of advanced complementary metal-oxide-semiconductor device technologies.

References 

Fellow Members of the IEEE
Living people
Year of birth missing (living people)
Place of birth missing (living people)